CBAL may refer to:

 current balance
 CBAL-FM, a radio station (98.3 FM) licensed to Moncton, New Brunswick, Canada